I Feel Like Playing is the seventh studio album by Ronnie Wood.

Personnel
Ronnie Wood - Vocals, guitar, bass (track 5), harmonica (track 10), keyboards (track 2)
Slash - Guitar (tracks: 1, 2, 7, 10, 12)
Bob Rock - Guitar (tracks: 3, 6)
Billy Gibbons - Guitar (tracks: 4, 5)
Waddy Wachtel - Guitar (tracks: 8, 9, 11)
Flea - Bass (tracks: 1, 4, 7)
Darryl Jones - Bass (tracks: 2, 3, 6, 10, 12)
Rick Rosas - Bass (tracks: 8, 9, 11)
Ivan Neville - Keyboard (tracks: 1, 4, 7, 10, 12)
Ian McLagan - Keyboard (tracks: 3, 6, 8, 9, 11)
Jim Keltner - Drums (tracks: 1, 3, 4, 6, 7, 10, 12)
Steve Ferrone - Drums (tracks: 2, 5, 8, 9)
Johnny Ferraro - Drums (tracks: 11)
Bernard Fowler - Backing vocals (tracks: 2, 3, 5, 6, 8, 9, 11), vocals (tracks: 4, 7, 12)
Blondie Chaplin - Backing vocals (tracks: 3, 5, 8)
Bobby Womack - Backing vocals (tracks: 3, 5, 8, 12)
Kevin Gibbs - Backing vocals (tracks: 11)
Saranella Bell - Backing vocals (tracks: 11)
Skip McDonald - Backing vocals (tracks: 11)

Production
Arranged by (Strings) – Karl Eagan
Engineers – Eddie Delana, Jun Murakawa, Martin Pradler
Assistant engineers – Brian Capello, Charlie Paakkari, Doug Tyo, Jimmy Fahey, John Cornfield, Kenny Eisennagel
Mastered by – Steve Marcussen

References

2010 albums
Ronnie Wood albums